In mathematics, Proizvolov's identity is an identity concerning sums of differences of positive integers.  The identity was posed by Vyacheslav Proizvolov as a problem in the 1985 All-Union Soviet Student Olympiads .

To state the identity, take the first 2N positive integers,

1, 2, 3, ..., 2N − 1, 2N,

and partition them into two subsets of N numbers each.  Arrange one subset in increasing order:

Arrange the other subset in decreasing order:

Then the sum

is always equal to N2.

Example
Take for example N = 3. The set of numbers is then {1, 2, 3, 4, 5, 6}. Select three numbers of this set, say 2, 3 and 5. Then the sequences A and B are:
A1 = 2, A2 = 3, and A3 = 5;
B1 = 6, B2 = 4, and B3 = 1.

The sum is

which indeed equals 32.

A Proof
A slick proof of the identity is as follows. Note that for any , we have that :. For this reason, it suffices to establish that the sets  and : coincide. Since the numbers  are all distinct, it therefore suffices to show that for any , . Clearly, these numbers are all distinct (due to the construction), but they are at most : a contradiction is reached.

References
 .

External links
Proizvolov's identity at cut-the-knot.org
A video illustration (and proof outline) of Proizvolov's identity by Dr. James Grime

Recreational mathematics
Theorems in number theory